Joaquín Mariano de Mosquera-Figueroa y Arboleda-Salazar (14 December 1787 – 4 April 1878) was a Colombian statesman and a Founding Father of Colombia who served as the 3rd and 5th President of Gran Colombia. Mosquera also served as Vice President of the Republic of New Granada. During the administration of President Simón Bolívar, he was named as the 1st Envoy Extraordinary and Minister Plenipotentiary to the nascent states of Peru, the United Provinces of South America, and Chile with the purpose of creating unity amongst the South American nations.

References
 Méndez Valencia, Aría Alexandra "Joaquín Mosquera" at Biblioteca Luis Ángel Arango, 2004. In Spanish
 "Joaquín Mariano Mosquera" at Capitán Paz-Fuerza Aérea Colombiana.
 Joaquín Mariano Mosquera at Presidencia de la República de Colombia. In Spanish

1787 births
1878 deaths
People from Popayán
Colombian people of Galician descent
Colombian Conservative Party politicians
Colombian blind people
Presidents of Gran Colombia
Ambassadors of Colombia to Argentina
Ambassadors of Colombia to Chile
Ambassadors of Colombia to Peru
Politicians with disabilities
Vice presidents of Colombia
19th-century Colombian people